Kümbetli is a village in the central (Kars) district of Kars Province, Turkey at . The population of Kümbetli  was 1578 as of 2011.

When the territory of Kars became part of the Russian Empire after the Russo-Turkish War (1877-1878), Russian Protestants of the Molokan sect founded several villages around Kars, including this one, which they named Vladikars. In 1921 the region became part of Turkey. Most of the Molakan population left  and Karapapaks (a Turkmen people) from Georgia settled in the village. The major economic activity of the village is dairying.

Trivia
The Turkish film Piano Girl is about Molokan community in Kars province.

References

Populated places in Kars Province
Towns in Turkey
Kars Central District